The Assassination Option is the second novel in the Clandestine Operations Series by  W.E.B. Griffin and William E. Butterworth IV.

Plot
This novel centers around Capt. James Cronley, the central character of the first novel of the series. Cronley has been promoted to be commander of a new unit in the new Central Intelligence Agency. As the chief of DCI Europe, Cronley has to deal with all sorts of intrigue, much of it involving U.S. government and military personnel unhappy with the creation and power of the new CIA. Cronley and the people working with and for him, have a new mission to bring the family of a Soviet informant out of East Germany and to freedom. In the process Cronley must fend off attempts to undermine his authority. Cronley's mother was a German national and he runs across German relatives and he finds all with them is not what it seems.

Reviews
Kirkus Reviews seemed to like this book, in spite of pointing out a few historical errors. Book Reporter, as well, liked this book, saying, "It reads well and reminds us of the difficulty posed in intelligence work, especially at the beginning of the Cold War with Russia."

Publishers Weekly has a positive view of this book, saying, "It's a testament to the authors' skill and wide experience that the pages seem to turn themselves."

References

American spy novels
2014 American novels
Cold War spy novels
G. P. Putnam's Sons books